Dollar Academy, founded in 1818 by John McNabb, is a private co-educational day and boarding school in Scotland. The open campus occupies a  site in the centre of Dollar, Clackmannanshire, at the foot of the Ochil Hills.

Overview
As of 2020, there are over 1200 pupils at Dollar Academy, making it the sixth largest independent school in Scotland.

Day pupils are usually from the village of Dollar or the surrounding counties of Clackmannanshire, Stirlingshire, Perth and Kinross, and Fife. The remaining pupils are boarders. Almost 50% of the boarding pupils are from overseas, with the rest being British nationals. The overall share of international students is about 20% of all students.

History

Dollar was founded in 1818 following a bequest by Captain John McNab or McNabb. He captained, owned and leased out many ships over the decades and it is known that at least four voyages transported black slaves to the West Indies in 1789–91, less than twenty years before the Slave Trade Act 1807. In 2019, in order to understand the extent of John McNabb’s involvement in the slave trade, research was commissioned in collaboration with external advisors. The school had been "shamed" about this connection in 1998. The school also teaches about McNabb's links to the slave trade in several subjects. McNabb bequeathed part of his fortune – £65,000,  –  to provide "a charity or school for the poor of the parish of Dollar where I was born".

Architecture

William Playfair was commissioned to design the building. The interior of the Playfair Building was gutted by a fire in 1961, but Playfair's Greek-style outer facades remained intact. The interior was rebuilt on a plan based on central corridors with equal sized classrooms on both sides. An extra (second) floor was concealed, increasing the total available space. The school was re-opened in 1966 by former pupil Lord Heyworth, and the assembly hall was rebuilt after the fire. The school library is a "whispering gallery" because of its domed ceiling.

Many other buildings have been added to the school over time- such as the Dewar Building for science and the Maguire Building for art and physical education. And in 2016 the Westwater Building was added, named after Private George Philip Westwater, an FP killed in the First World War at Gallipoli. This building contains the Modern Languages department and two Economics classrooms.

Traditions

Each year full colours and half colours are awarded to senior pupils for achievement in sporting or cultural pursuits. These awards merit piping on the school blazer (blue for cultural, white for sporting) and/or a distinctive blazer badge. Internationalists' Award ties are presented to pupils, prep, junior and senior, who has represented their country in sporting or cultural activities.

Pipe Band 

The school has two main Pipe Bands. The "A" band won the Scottish Schools CCF Pipes and Drums competition every year from 2000 to 2012 and 2014 and 2015, as well as winning the RSPBA World Pipe Band Championships in 2010, 2014 and 2015. In 2013, the band was placed first at the last "Major" of the season, the Cowal Gathering. In 2015, the band won the Scottish, British, United Kingdom, European and World Championships, leading to them being awarded the title "Champion of Champions". Additionally, the Novice, or "B" band won the British, Scottish and European Championships in 2015, and was crowned "Champion of Champions".

Rectors
The Rev. Dr Andrew Mylne DD (1818–1850)
The Rev. Dr Thomas Burbidge (1850–1851)
The Dr John Milne LLD (1851–1868)
The Rev. Dr William Barrack (1868–1878)
George Thom (1878–1902)
Charles Dougall (1902–1923)
Hugh Martin (1923–1936)
Harry Bell OBE (1936–1960)
James Millar (1960–1962) – Acting Rector
Graham Richardson (1962–1975)
Ian Hendry (1975–1984)
Lloyd Harrison (1984–1994)
John Robertson (1994–2010)
David Knapman (2010–2019)
Ian Munro (current Rector)

Former pupils

Academia and science
John Thomas Irvine Boswell, botanist
John Macmillan Brown, university professor and administrator
Andrew Clark, church of England clergyman, scholar and diarist 
Sir James Dewar, inventor of the Vacuum flask
John Archibald Watt Dollar, veterinarian to four monarchs
George Alexander Gibson, physician and geologist
Sir David Gill, astronomer
William Frederick Harvey, public health expert, Director of the Central Research Institute in India, Vice President of the Royal Society of Edinburgh
Professor Sir Donald Mackay, economist
Matthew Hay, physician and forensic expert
John Robertson Henderson FRSE zoologist and antiquary
Sir Hector Hetherington, social philosopher
Henry Halcro Johnston botanist
James MacRitchie, Municipal Engineer in Singapore 1883–95, Lighthouse Engineer in Japan
James Samuel Risien Russell Guyanese-British physician, neurologist,
Sir David Wallace, CMG, FRCSEd, Surgeon
Andrew Wilson FRSE (1852-1912) zoologist and author

Politics
Herbert Beresford, Canadian politician
Sir George Christopher Molesworth Birdwood, colonial administrator in India
Lord Constable CBE, KC, Conservative politician and judge
William Scott Fell, Australian Liberal politician and businessman
Sir John Dunlop Imrie FRSE CBE, City Chamberlain of Edinburgh 1926–1951, First Government Commissioner of Trinidad and Tobago 1951–53
Sir George Reid, Lord Lieutenant for Clackmannanshire and former Presiding Officer of the Scottish Parliament
Sir William Snadden Bt, Conservative politician
Euphemia Gilchrist Somerville, social worker and local politician 
Sir Frank Swettenham, first Resident-General of the Federated Malay States
Mandy Telford, former President of the National Union of Students
James Galloway Weir, Liberal MP and sewing machine entrepreneur
Rt Hon Lord Keen of Elie PC QC, Conservative Party politician lawyer

Media and arts
 Henry Clark Barlow, literary scholar
 Ian Hamilton Finlay, poet, playwright, artist and experimental garden designer
 Alasdair Hutton OBE TD, announcer, former journalist and politician
 Alan Johnston, BBC Gaza correspondent taken hostage in 2007
 Doreen Jones, casting director
 Fergus McCreadie, jazz musician and 2022 Mercury Prize nominee
 Fraser Nelson, journalist
 George Henry Paulin, sculptor
 Jessie M. Soga, LRAM,  contralto singer and suffragist
 Jo L. Walton, poet
 Harry Raymond Egerton Watt, film director
 Andrew Whalley, architect

Law
Lord Brodie, judge
Andrew Constable, Lord Constable
Caroline Flanagan, President of the Law Society of Scotland 2005
Richard Keen, Baron Keen of Elie, Advocate General and Justice Minister
James Avon Clyde, Lord Clyde, judge

Military
Sir Charles Morton Forbes, naval officer
Colin Mackenzie, army and political officer in India

Royal or noble
The Master of Bruce (future 13th Earl of Elgin)
Various members of the Ethiopian Imperial Family including the nephews of Haile Selassie
James MacArthur of Milton, Chief of Clan Arthur
The Master of Moncreiff (future 7th Baron Moncreiff)
Sir Arthur Bolt Nicolson, 9th Bt

Business
Iain Anderson, automotive industry executive
David Greig, landowner
Lord Heyworth of Oxton, Chairman of Unilever and ICI
Sir Archibald Page, engineer and electricity supply manager
Sir William Reid - mining engineer and joint author of the "Reid Report" on the state of British mining
Sir Wei Yuk – nineteenth-century Hong Kong businessman and legislator

Sport
Iain Anderson, first-class cricketer
Jim Thompson, Scottish 7s rugby player
John Barclay, Scottish rugby player
Hamish Brown mountaineer and writer
Adam Kelso Fulton, Scottish rugby player
Cameron Glasgow, Scottish rugby player
Rory Lawson, Scottish rugby player
Graeme Morrison, Scottish rugby player
Jennifer McIntosh, Rifle shooter, five times Commonwealth Games Medallist, double European Champion and two-time Olympian
Shirley McIntosh, Rifle shooter, four times Commonwealth Games Medallist
Seonaid McIntosh, Rifle shooter, double Commonwealth Games Medallist, double European Champion and Olympian
Archibald MacLaren, gymnast, fencing master and author
Mike Adamson, former Scottish rugby player and referee
Hugh Stewart, cricketer and cricket administrator

Miscellaneous
Sara Mendes da Costa, voice of the speaking clock
Charles Maxwell Heddle, merchant
Sir Thomas Morison Legge, factory inspector 
Tom Kitchin, Michelin starred Chef
G. A. Frank Knight, minister, archaeological author and conchologist

Notable teachers

 Andrew Bell (1753–1832), educationalist and divine (Mathematics Master)
Patrick Syme (1774-1845), flower painter
 Patrick Gibson (1782–1829), landscape painter (Professor of Painting)
 William Tennant (1784–1848), linguist and poet (Master of Classical and Oriental Languages)
 Prof David Laird Adams (1837–1892) (Classical and Oriental languages)
Adam Robson (1928-2007), Scottish Rugby Internationalist (Head of Art)
Jilly McCord (History and Modern Studies Teacher)

References

External links

Exam Results 2006
Dollar Academy's page on Scottish Schools Online

Educational institutions established in 1818
Category A listed buildings in Clackmannanshire
Listed schools in Scotland
Member schools of the Headmasters' and Headmistresses' Conference
Boarding schools in Clackmannanshire
Private schools in Clackmannanshire
Dollar, Clackmannanshire